CDSS may refer to:
Centre for Defence and Strategic Studies at the Australian Defence College
Clinical decision support system
California Department of Social Services
Country Dance and Song Society, a nonprofit organization that seeks to promote participatory dance, music, and song with English and North American roots